David Rosen may refer to:

 David Rosen (businessman) (born 1930), CEO of SEGA
 David Rosen (entomologist) (1936-1997), Israeli entomologist
 David Rosen (musicologist) (born 1938), professor of musicology at Cornell University
 David Rosen (politics), fundraiser for Hillary Clinton in 2000
 David Rosen (rabbi) (born 1951), former Chief Rabbi of Ireland
 David Rosen (literary scholar), American literary scholar
 David M. Rosen, American anthropologist
 David Rosen (artist) (1959–2014), South African artist and fashion designer
 David H. Rosen (born 1945), American psychiatrist, Jungian analyst, and author
 David Rosen, CEO and lead programmer at Wolfire Games
 David Rosen (Scandal), a fictional character in the TV series